The Organization of the Jews in Bulgaria (OJB) coordinates the different Jewish communities in Bulgaria, a country where about 8000 Jews live. This organization organizes programs and projects. The tasks of Shalom – OJB are mainly:
Keeping up and promoting the Jewish values and traditions regarding ethnological, linguistic and cultural aspects
Defending the constitutional rights of its members as well as of all Jews in Bulgaria against the state, its organs and other public and political facilities of the state
Supporting the reduction of racism, totalitarianism, antidemocratical tendencies, fascism, anti-Semitism and national chauvinism in any kind
Cooperating with any societies and organizations at home and abroad which correlate to the principles of democracy and human rights
Organizing seminars, academic facilities and other training centers
Marketing and popularization of the Jewish values
Promoting education and culture
Organizing concerts, stage plays and book presentations
Building up data archives
Maintaining the historical sites (synagogues, graves, memorials etc.)

External links
Organization of the Jews in Bulgaria "Shalom"
Gedenkdienst
Dimana Trankova, Anthony Georgieff, "Guide to Jewish Bulgaria," Vagabond Media Sofia, 2011

Jews and Judaism in Bulgaria
Religious organizations based in Bulgaria
Holocaust commemoration